The 2010 Quintana Roo gubernatorial election was held on 4 July 2010, in the Mexican state of Quintana Roo.

Results

References 

Quintana Roo
Quintana Roo
Quintana Roo gubernatorial election